The Vače Belt-Plate ( or) is one of the best examples of Illyrian art and toreutic art.

Discovery
The Vače Belt-Plate was discovered at the Hallstatt Archaeological Site in Vače, Slovenia, where several Illyrian situlae were found, the best known of which is the Vače Situla.

The artifact
The belt-plate dates to the 5th century BC and is displayed at the Vienna Natural History Museum. It is 28.5 cm long and depicts five figures, four of which are warriors in combat. Two of the central warriors are on horseback. These may be depictions of mythological events.

References

Illyrian art
Archaeological discoveries in Slovenia
Iron Age of Slovenia
Bronzeware
War art